Jim Gerhardt (March 2, 1929 – November 29, 2021) was an American athlete. He competed in the men's triple jump at the 1952 Summer Olympics. Gerhardt died in Houston on November 29, 2021, at the age of 92.

References

External links
 

1929 births
2021 deaths
Athletes (track and field) at the 1952 Summer Olympics
American male triple jumpers
Olympic track and field athletes of the United States
Track and field athletes from San Antonio